This article lists the statutes amending the internal revenue laws of the United States.

1800-1899
 Ch. 45, 12 Stat. 292 Enacted 08/05/1861 Revenue Act of 1861
 Ch. 119, 12 Stat. 432 Enacted 07/01/1862 Revenue Act of 1862
 13 Stat. 22 Enacted 06/30/1864 Revenue Act of 1864
 Ch. 349, §73, 28 Stat. 570, Enacted 08/27/1894 Wilson–Gorman Tariff Act

1900s
 ch. 6, 36 Stat. 11 Payne–Aldrich Tariff Act

1910s
 Revenue Act of 1913
 Emergency Internal Revenue Tax Act
 Revenue Act of 1916
 War Revenue Act of 1917
 Revenue Act of 1918

1920s
 Revenue Act of 1921
 Revenue Act of 1924
 Revenue Act of 1926
 Revenue Act of 1928

1930s
 Revenue Act of 1932
 Revenue Act of 1934
 Revenue Act of 1935
 Revenue Act of 1936
 Revenue Act of 1937
 Internal Revenue Code of 1939

1940s
 Revenue Act of 1940
 Second Revenue Act of 1940
 Revenue Act of 1941
 Revenue Act of 1942
 Revenue Act of 1943
 Current Tax Payment Act of 1943
 Individual Income Tax Act of 1944
 Revenue Act of 1945
 Revenue Act of 1948

1950s
 Revenue Act of 1950
 Excess profits tax (1950)
 Revenue Act of 1951
 Excise Tax Reduction Act of 1954
 P.L. 517, 83rd Cong. Enacted 07/22/1954 Revised Organic Act of the Virgin Islands
 P.L. 703, 83rd Cong. Enacted 08/30/1954 Atomic Energy Act of 1954
 P.L. 729, 83rd Cong. Eancted 08/31/1954
 P.L. 746, 83rd Cong. Enacted 08/31/1954
 P.L. 761, 83rd Cong. Enacted 09/01/1954 Social Security Amendments of 1954
 P.L. 767, 83rd Cong. Enacted 09/01/1954
 P.L. 1, 84th Cong. Enacted 01/20/1955
 P.L. 9, 84th Cong. Enacted 03/02/1955
 P.L. 18, 84th Cong. Enacted 03/30/1955 Tax Rate Extension Act of 1955
 P.L. 74, 84th Cong. Enacted 06/15/1955
 P.L. 299, 84th Cong. Enacted 08/09/1955
 P.L. 306, 84th Cong. Enacted 08/09/1955
 P.L. 317, 84th Cong. Enacted 08/09/1955
 P.L. 321, 84th Cong. Enacted 08/09/1955
 P.L. 333, 84th Cong. Enacted 08/09/1955
 P.L. 354, 84th Cong. Enacted 08/11/1955
 P.L. 355, 84th Cong. Enacted 08/11/1955
 P.L. 366, 84th Cong. Enacted 08/11/1955
 P.L. 367, 84th Cong. Enacted 08/11/1955
 P.L. 379, 84th Cong. Enacted 08/12/1955
 P.L. 384, 84th Cong. Enacted 08/12/1955
 P.L. 385, 84th Cong. Enacted 08/12/1955
 P.L. 396, 84th Cong. Enacted 01/28/1956
 P.L. 398, 84th Cong. Enacted 01/28/1956
 P.L. 400, 84th Cong. Enacted 01/28/1956
 P.L. 414, 84th Cong. Enacted 02/20/1956
 P.L. 429, 84th Cong. Enacted 03/13/1956 Life Insurance Company Tax Act for 1955
 P.L. 458, 84th Cong. Enacted 03/29/1956 Tax Rate Extension Act of 1956
 P.L. 466, 84th Cong. Enacted 04/02/1956
 P.L. 495, 84th Cong. Enacted 04/27/1956
 P.L. 511, 84th Cong. Enacted 05/09/1956 Bank Holding Company Act of 1956
 P.L. 545, 84th Cong. Enacted 05/29/1956
 P.L. 627, 84th Cong. Enacted 06/29/1956 Federal-Aid Highway Act of 1956
 P.L. 628, 84th Cong. Enacted 06/29/1956 
 P.L. 629, 84th Cong. Enacted 06/29/1956
 P.L. 700, 84th Cong. Enacted 07/11/1956
 P.L. 726, 84th Cong. Enacted 07/18/1956 Mutual Security Act of 1956
 P.L. 728, 84th Cong. Enacted 07/18/1956 Narcotic Control Act of 1956
 P.L. 784, 84th Cong. Enacted 07/24/1956
 P.L. 796, 84th Cong. Enacted 07/25/1956
 P.L. 880, 84th Cong. Enacted 08/01/1956 Social Security Amendments of 1956
 P.L. 881, 84th Cong. Enacted 08/01/1956 Servicemen's and Veterans' Survivor Benefits Act
 P.L. 896, 84th Cong. Enacted 08/01/1956
 P.L. 1010, 84th Cong. Enacted 08/06/1956
 P.L. 1011, 84th Cong. Enacted 08/06/1956
 P.L. 1015, 84th Cong. Enacted 08/07/1956
 P.L. 1022, 84th Cong. Enacted 08/07/1956
 P.L. 85-12 Enacted 03/29/1957 Tax Rate Extension Act of 1957
 P.L. 85-56 Enacted 06/17/1957 Veterans' Benefits Act of 1957
 P.L. 85-74 Enacted 08/29/1957
 P.L. 85-165 Enacted 08/26/1957
 P.L. 85-235 Enacted 08/30/1957
 P.L. 85-239 Enacted 02/30/1958
 P.L. 85-320 Enacted 02/11/1958
 P.L. 85-321 Enacted 02/11/1958
 P.L. 85-323 Enacted 03/11/1958
 P.L. 85-345 Enacted 03/17/1958
 P.L. 85-367 Enacted 04/07/1958
 P.L. 85-380 Enacted 04/16/1958
 P.L. 85-475 Enacted 06/30/1958 Tax Rate Extension Act of 1958
 P.L. 85-475 Enacted 08/28/1958
 P.L. 85-517 Enacted 08/28/1958 Social Security Amendments of 1958
 P.L. 85-840 Enacted 09/02/1958 Excise Tax Technical Changes Act of 1958
 P.L. 85-859 Enacted 09/02/1958 Technical Amendments Act of 1958
 P.L. 85-866 Enacted 09/02/1958 Small Business Tax Revision Act of 1958
 P.L. 85-881 Enacted 09/02/1958
 P.L. 86-28 Enacted 05/19/1959
 P.L. 86-69 Enacted 06/25/1959 Life Insurance Company Income Tax Act of 1959
 P.L. 86-70 Enacted 06/25/1959 Alaska Omnibus Bill
 P.L. 86-75 Enacted 06/30/1959 Tax Rate Extension Act of 1959
 P.L. 81-141 Enacted 08/07/1959
 P.L. 86-168 Enacted 08/18/1959 Farm Credit Act of 1959
 P.L. 86-175 Enacted 08/21/1959
 P.L. 86-280 Enacted 09/16/1959
 P.L. 86-319 Enacted 09/21/1959
 P.L. 86-342 Enacted 09/21/1959 Federal-Aid Highway Act of 1959
 P.L. 86-344 Enacted 09/21/1959
 P.L. 86-346 Enacted 09/22/1959
 P.L. 86-368 Enacted 09/22/1959
 P.L. 86-376 Enacted 09/23/1959

1960s
 P.L. 86-413 Enacted 04/08/1960
 P.L. 86-416 Enacted 04/08/1960
 P.L. 86-418 Enacted 04/08/1960
 P.L. 86-422 Enacted 04/08/1960
 P.L. 86-428 Enacted 04/22/1960
 P.L. 86-429 Enacted 04/22/1960 Narcotics Manufacturing Act of 1960
 P.L. 86-435 Enacted 04/22/1960
 P.L. 86-437 Enacted 04/22/1960
 P.L. 86-440 Enacted 04/22/1960
 P.L. 86-459 Enacted 05/13/1960 Dealer Reserve Income Adjustment Act of 1960
 P.L. 86-470 Enacted 05/14/1960
 P.L. 86-478 Enacted 06/01/1960
 P.L. 86-496 Enacted 06/08/1960
 P.L. 86-564 Enacted 06/30/1960 Public Debt and Tax Rate Extension Act of 1960
 P.L. 86-592 Enacted 07/06/1960
 P.L. 86-594 Enacted 07/06/1960
 P.L. 86-624 Enacted 07/12/1960 Hawaii Omnibus Act
 P.L. 86-667 Enacted 07/14/1960
 P.L. 86-707 Enacted 09/06/1960 Overseas Differentials and Allowances Act
 P.L. 86-723 Enacted 09/08/1960 Foreign Service Act Amendments of 1960
 P.L. 86-778 Enacted 09/13/1960 Social Security Amendments of 1960
 P.L. 86-779 Enacted 09/14/1960 
 P.L. 86-780 Enacted 09/14/1960 
 P.L. 86-781 Enacted 09/14/1960 
 P.L. 87-6 Enacted 03/24/1961 Temporary Extended Unemployment Compensation Act of 1961
 P.L. 87-15 Enacted 03/31/1961
 P.L. 87-29 Enacted 05/04/1961
 P.L. 87-59 Enacted 06/27/1961
 P.L. 87-61 Enacted 06/29/1961 Federal-Aid Highway Act of 1961
 P.L. 87-64 Enacted 06/30/1961 Social Security Amendments of 1961
 P.L. 87-72 Enacted 06/30/1961 Tax Rate Extension Act of 1961
 P.L. 87-109 Enacted 07/26/1961
 P.L. 87-256 Enacted 09/21/1961 Mutual Educational and Cultural Exchange Act of 1961
 P.L. 87-293 Enacted 09/22/1961 Peace Corps Act
 P.L. 87-321 Enacted 09/26/1961
 P.L. 87-370 Enacted 10/04/1961
 P.L. 87-397 Enacted 10/05/1961
 P.L. 87-403 Enacted 02/02/1962
 P.L. 87-426 Enacted 03/31/1962
 P.L. 87-456 Enacted 05/24/1962 Tariff Classification Act of 1962
 P.L. 87-508 Enacted 06/28/1962 Tax Rate Extension Act of 1962
 P.L. 87-535 Enacted 07/13/1962 Sugar Act Amendments of 1962
 P.L. 87-682 Enacted 09/25/1962
 P.L. 87-710 Enacted 09/27/1962
 P.L. 87-722 Enacted 09/28/1962
 P.L. 87-768 Enacted 10/09/1962
 P.L. 87-770 Enacted 10/09/1962
 P.L. 87-790 Enacted 10/10/1962
 P.L. 87-792 Enacted 10/10/1962 Self-Employed Individuals Tax Retirement Act of 1962
 P.L. 87-794 Enacted 10/11/1962 Trade Expansion Act of 1962
 P.L. 87-834 Enacted 10/16/1962 Revenue Act of 1962
 P.L. 87-858 Enacted 10/23/1962
 P.L. 87-863 Enacted 10/23/1962
 P.L. 87-870 Enacted 10/23/1962
 P.L. 87-876 Enacted 10/24/1962
 P.L. 88-4 Enacted 04/02/1963
 P.L. 88-9 Enacted 04/10/1963
 P.L. 88-31 Enacted 05/29/1963
 P.L. 88-36 Enacted 06/04/1963
 P.L. 88-52 Enacted 06/29/1963 Tax Rate Extension Act of 1963
 P.L. 88-133 Enacted 10/05/1963
 P.L. 88-173 Enacted 11/07/1963
 P.L. 88-272 Enacted 02/26/1964 Revenue Act of 1964
 P.L. 88-342 Enacted 06/30/1964
 P.L. 88-348 Enacted 06/30/1964 Excise Tax Rate Extension Act of 1964
 P.L. 88-380 Enacted 07/17/1964
 P.L. 88-426 Enacted 08/14/1964 Government Employees Salary Act of 1964
 P.L. 88-484 Enacted 08/22/1964
 P.L. 88-539 Enacted 08/31/1963
 P.L. 88-554 Enacted 08/31/1964
 P.L. 88-563 Enacted 09/02/1964 Interest Equalization Tax Act
 P.L. 88-570 Enacted 09/02/1964
 P.L. 88-571 Enacted 09/02/1964
 P.L. 88-650 Enacted 10/13/1964
 P.L. 88-653 Enacted 10/13/1964
 P.L. 89-44 Enacted 06/21/1965 Excise Tax Reduction Act of 1965
 P.L. 89-97 Enacted 07/30/1965 Social Security Amendments of 1965
 P.L. 89-212 Enacted 09/29/1965
 P.L. 89-243 Enacted 10/09/1965 Interest Equalization Tax Extension Act of 1965
 P.L. 89-331 Enacted 11/08/1965 Sugar Act Amendments of 1965
 P.L. 89-352 Enacted 02/02/1966
 P.L. 89-354 Enacted 02/02/1966
 P.L. 89-365 Enacted 03/08/1966
 P.L. 89-368 Enacted 03/15/1966 Tax Adjustment Act of 1966
 P.L. 89-384 Enacted 04/08/1966
 P.L. 89-389 Enacted 04/14/1966
 P.L. 89-493 Enacted 07/05/1966
 P.L. 89-523 Enacted 08/01/1966
 P.L. 89-570 Enacted 09/12/1966
 P.L. 89-621 Enacted 10/04/1966
 P.L. 89-699 Enacted 10/30/1966
 P.L. 87-700 Enacted 10/30/1966
 P.L. 89-713 Enacted 11/02/1966
 P.L. 89-719 Enacted 11/02/1966 Federal Tax Lien Act of 1966
 P.L. 89-721 Enacted 11/02/1966
 P.L. 89-722 Enacted 11/02/1966
 P.L. 89-739 Enacted 11/08/1966
 P.L. 89-793 Enacted 11/08/1966
 P.L. 89-800 Enacted 11/08/1966
 P.L. 89-809 Enacted 11/13/1966 Foreign Investors Tax Act of 1966
 P.L. 90-26 Enacted 06/13/1967
 P.L. 90-59 Enacted 07/31/1967 Interest Equalization Tax Extension Act of 1967
 P.L. 90-73 Enacted 08/29/1967
 P.L. 90-78 Enacted 08/31/1967
 P.L. 90-225 Enacted 12/27/1967
 P.L. 90-240 Enacted 01/02/1968
 P.L. 90-248 Enacted 01/02/1968 Social Security Amendments of 1967
 P.L. 90-285 Enacted 04/12/1968
 P.L. 90-346 Enacted 06/18/1968
 P.L. 90-364 Enacted 06/28/1968 Revenue and Expenditure Control Act of 1968
 P.L. 90-607 Enacted 10/21/1968
 P.L. 90-615 Enacted 10/21/1968
 P.L. 90-618 Enacted 10/22/1968 Gun Control Act of 1968
 P.L. 90-619 Enacted 10/22/1968
 P.L. 90-621 Enacted 10/22/1968
 P.L. 90-622 Enacted 10/22/1968
 P.L. 90-624 Enacted 10/22/1968
 P.L. 90-634 Enacted 10/24/1968 Renogotiation Amendments Act of 1968
 P.L. 91-36 Enacted 06/30/1968
 P.L. 91-50 Enacted 08/02/1969
 P.L. 91-53 Enacted 08/07/1969
 P.L. 91-65 Enacted 08/25/1969
 P.L. 91-128 Enacted 11/26/1969 Interest Equalization Tax Extension Act of 1969
 P.L. 91-172 Enacted 12/30/1969 Tax Reform Act of 1969

1970s
 P.L. 91-215 Enacted 03/17/1970
 P.L. 91-258 Enacted 05/21/1970 Airport and Airway Revenue Act of 1970
 P.L. 91-373 Enacted 08/10/1970 Employment Security Amendments of 1970
 P.L. 91-420 Enacted 09/25/1970
 P.L. 91-513 Enacted 10/27/1970
 P.L. 91-518 Enacted 10/30/1970 Rail Passenger Service Act of 1970
 P.L. 91-605 Enacted 12/31/1970 Federal-Aid Highway Act of 1970
 P.L. 91-606 Enacted 12/31/1970 Disaster Relief Act of 1970
 P.L. 91-614 Enacted 12/31/1970 Excise, Estate, and Gift Tax Adjustment Act of 1970
 P.L. 91-618 Enacted 12/31/1970
 P.L. 91-659 Enacted 01/08/1971
 P.L. 91-673 Enacted 01/12/1971
 P.L. 91-676 Enacted 01/12/1971
 P.L. 91-677 Enacted 01/12/1971
 P.L. 91-678 Enacted 01/12/1971
 P.L. 91-679 Enacted 01/12/1971
 P.L. 91-680 Enacted 01/12/1971
 P.L. 91-681 Enacted 01/12/1971
 P.L. 91-683 Enacted 01/12/1971
 P.L. 91-684 Enacted 01/12/1971
 P.L. 91-686 Enacted 01/12/1971
 P.L. 91-687 Enacted 01/12/1971
 P.L. 91-688 Enacted 01/12/1971
 P.L. 91-691 Enacted 01/12/1971
 P.L. 91-693 Enacted 01/12/1971
 P.L. 92-5 Enacted 03/17/1971
 P.L. 92-9 Enacted 04/01/1971 Interest Equalization Tax Extension Act of 1971
 P.L. 92-41 Enacted 07/01/1971
 P.L. 92-138 Enacted 10/14/1971 Sugar Act Amendments of 1971
 P.L. 92-178 Enacted 12/10/1971 Revenue Act of 1971
 P.L. 92-279 Enacted 04/26/1972
 P.L. 92-310 Enacted 06/06/1972
 P.L. 92-329 Enacted 06/30/1972
 P.L. 92-336 Enacted 07/01/1972
 P.L. 92-418 Enacted 08/29/1972
 P.L. 92-512 Enacted 10/20/1972 State and Local Fiscal Assistance Act of 1972
 P.L. 92-558 Enacted 10/25/1972
 P.L. 92-580 Enacted 10/27/1972
 P.L. 92-603 Enacted 10/30/1972 Social Security Amendments of 1972
 P.L. 92-606 Enacted 10/31/1972
 P.L. 93-17 Enacted 04/10/1973 Interest Equalization Tax Extension Act of 1973
 P.L. 93-53 Enacted 07/01/1973
 P.L. 93-66 Enacted 07/09/1973
 P.L. 93-69 Enacted 07/10/1973
 P.L. 93-233 Enacted 12/31/1973
 P.L. 93-288 Enacted 05/22/1974 Disaster Relief Act of 1974
 P.L. 93-310 Enacted 06/08/1974
 P.L. 93-368 Enacted 08/07/1974
 P.L. 93-406 Enacted 09/02/1974 Employee Retirement Income Security Act of 1974
 P.L. 93-443 Enacted 10/15/1974 Federal Election Campaign Act Amendments of 1974
 P.L. 93-445 Enacted 10/16/1974
 P.L. 93-480 Enacted 10/26/1974
 P.L. 93-482 Enacted 10/26/1974
 P.L. 93-483 Enacted 10/26/1974
 P.L. 93-490 Enacted 10/26/1974
 P.L. 93-499 Enacted 10/29/1974
 P.L. 93-597 Enacted 01/02/1975
 P.L. 93-625 Enacted 01/03/1975
 P.L. 94-12 Enacted 03/29/1975 Tax Reduction Act of 1975
 P.L. 94-45 Enacted 06/30/1975 Emergency Compensation and Special Unemployment Assistance Extension Act of 1975
 P.L. 94-81 Enacted 08/09/1975
 P.L. 94-92 Enacted 08/09/1975
 P.L. 94-93 Enacted 08/09/1975
 P.L. 94-164 Enacted 12/23/1975 Revenue Adjustment Act of 1975
 P.L. 94-202 Enacted 01/02/1976
 P.L. 94-253 Enacted 03/31/1976
 P.L. 94-267 Enacted 04/15/1976
 P.L. 94-273 Enacted 04/21/1976 Fiscal Year Adjustment Act
 P.L. 94-280 Enacted 05/05/1976
 P.L. 94-283 Enacted 05/11/1976 Federal Election Campaign Act Amendments of 1976
 P.L. 94-331 Enacted 06/30/1976
 P.L. 94-396 Enacted 09/03/1976
 P.L. 94-401 Enacted 09/07/1976
 P.L. 94-414 Enacted 09/17/1976
 P.L. 94-452 Enacted 10/02/1976 Bank Holding Company Tax Act of 1976
 P.L. 94-455 Enacted 10/04/1976 Tax Reform Act of 1976
 P.L. 94-514 Enacted 10/15/1976
 P.L. 94-528 Enacted 10/17/1976
 P.L. 94-529 Enacted 10/17/1976
 P.L. 94-530 Enacted 10/17/1976
 P.L. 94-547 Enacted 10/18/1976
 P.L. 94-553 Enacted 10/19/1976 Copyrights Act
 P.L. 94-563 Enacted 10/19/1976
 P.L. 94-566 Enacted 10/20/1976 Unemployment Compensation Amendments of 1976
 P.L. 94-568 Enacted 10/20/1976
 P.L. 94-569 Enacted 10/20/1976
 P.L. 95-19 Enacted 04/12/1977 Emergency Unemployment Compensation Act of 1977
 P.L. 95-30 Enacted 05/23/77 Tax Reduction and Simplification Act of 1977
 P.L. 95-147 Enacted 10/28/77
 P.L. 95-171 Enacted 11/12/77
 P.L. 95-172 Enacted 11/12/77
 P.L. 95-176 Enacted 11/14/77
 P.L. 95-210 Enacted 12/13/77
 P.L. 95-216 Enacted 12/20/77
 P.L. 95-227 Enacted 02/10/78 Black Lung Benefits Revenue Act of 1977
 P.L. 95-339 Enacted 08/08/78 New York City Loan Guarantee Act of 1978
 P.L. 95-345 Enacted 08/15/78
 P.L. 95-423 Enacted 10/06/78
 P.L. 95-427 Enacted 10/07/78
 P.L. 95-458 Enacted 10/14/78
 P.L. 95-472 Enacted 10/17/78
 P.L. 95-473 Enacted 10/17/78
 P.L. 95-479 Enacted 10/18/78 Veterans' Disability Compensation and Surivors' Benefits Act of 1978
 P.L. 95-488 Enacted 10/20/78
 P.L. 95-502 Enacted 10/21/78 Inland Waterways Revenue Act of 1978
 P.L. 95-599 Enacted 11/06/78 Surface Transportation Assistance Act of 1978
 P.L. 95-600 Enacted 10/06/78 Revenue Act of 1978
 P.L. 95-615 Enacted 11/08/78 Tax Treatment Extension Act of 1978
 P.L. 95-618 Enacted 11/09/78 Energy Tax Act of 1978
 P.L. 95-628 Enacted 11/10/78
 P.L. 96-39 Enacted 07/26/79 Trade Agreements Act of 1979
 P.L. 96-72 Enacted 09/29/79 Export Administration Act of 1979
 P.L. 96-84 Enacted 10/10/79
 P.L. 96-167 Enacted 12/29/79

1980s
 P.L. 96-178 Enacted 01/02/80
 P.L. 96-187 Enacted 01/08/80 Federal Election Campaign Act Amendments of 1979
 P.L. 96-222 Enacted 04/01/80 Technical Corrections Act of 1979
 P.L. 96-223 Enacted 04/02/80 Crude Oil Windfall Profit Tax Act of 1980
 P.L. 96-249 Enacted 05/26/80 Food Stamp Act Amendments of 1980
 P.L. 96-265 Enacted 06/09/80 Social Security Disability Amendments of 1980
 P.L. 96-272 Enacted 06/17/80 Adoption Assistance and Child Welfare Actof 1980
 P.L. 96-283 Enacted 06/28/80 Deep Seabed Hard Mineral Resource Act
 P.L. 96-298 Enacted 07/01/80
 P.L. 96-364 Enacted 09/26/80 Multiemployer Pension Plan Amendments Act of 1980
 P.L. 96-417 Enacted 10/10/80 Customs Courts Act of 1980
 P.L. 96-439 Enacted 10/13/80
 P.L. 96-451 Enacted 10/14/80 Recreational Boating Safety and Fcilities Improvement Act of 1980
 P.L. 96-454 Enacted 10/15/80 Household Goods Transportation Act of 1980
 P.L. 96-465 Enacted 10/17/80 Foreign Service Act of 1980
 P.L. 96-471 Enacted 10/19/80 Installment Sales Revision Act of 1980
 P.L. 96-499 Enacted 12/05/80 Omnibus Reconciliation Act of 1980
 P.L. 96-510 Enacted 12/11/80 Comprehensive Environmental Response, Compensation, and Liability Act of 1980
 P.L. 96-541 Enacted 12/17/80
 P.L. 96-589 Enacted 12/24/80 Bankruptcy Tax Act of 1980
 P.L. 96-595 Enacted 12/24/80
 P.L. 96-596 Enacted 12/24/80
 P.L. 96-598 Enacted 12/24/80
 P.L. 96-601 Enacted 12/24/80
 P.L. 96-603 Enacted 12/28/80
 P.L. 96-605 Enacted 12/28/80 Miscellaneous Revenue Act of 1980
 P.L. 96-608 Enacted 12/28/80
 P.L. 96-613 Enacted 12/28/80
 P.L. 97-34 Enacted 08/13/81 Economic Recovery Tax Act of 1981
 P.L. 97-35 Enacted 08/13/81 Omnibus Budget Reconcilliation Act of 1981
 P.L. 97-51 Enacted 10/01/81
 P.L. 97-119 Enacted 12/29/81 Black Lung Benefits Revenue Act of 1981
 P.L. 97-123 Enacted 12/29/81
 P.L. 97-164 Enacted 04/02/82 Federal Courts Improvement Act of 1982
 P.L. 97-216 Enacted 07/18/82 Urgent Supplemental Appropriations Act, 1982
 P.L. 97-248 Enacted 09/03/82 Tax Equity and Fiscal Responsibility Act of 1982
 P.L. 97-258 Enacted 09/13/82
 P.L. 97-261 Enacted 09/20/82 Bus Regulatory Reform Act of 1982
 P.L. 97-354 Enacted 10/19/82 Subchapter S Revision Act of 1982
 P.L. 97-362 Enacted 10/25/82 Miscellaneous Revenue Act of 1982
 P.L. 97-365 Enacted 10/25/82 Debt Collection Act of 1982
 P.L. 97-414 Enacted 01/04/83 Orphan Drug Act
 P.L. 97-424 Enacted 01/06/83 Surface Transportation Assistance Act of 1982
 P.L. 97-448 Enacted 01/12/83 Technical Corrections Act of 1982
 P.L. 97-449 Enacted 01/12/83
 P.L. 97-452 Enacted 01/12/83
 P.L. 97-455 Enacted 01/12/83
 P.L. 97-473 Enacted 01/14/83
 P.L. 98-21 Enacted 04/20/83 Social Security Amendments of 1983
 P.L. 98-67 Enacted 08/05/83 Interest and Dividend Tax Compliance Act of 1983
 P.L. 98-76 Enacted 08/12/83 Railroad Retirement Solvency Act of 1983
 P.L. 98-135 Enacted 10/24/83 Federal Supplemental Compensation Amendments of 1983
 P.L. 98-213 Enacted 12/08/83
 P.L. 98-216 Enacted 02/14/84
 P.L. 98-259 Enacted 04/10/84
 P.L. 98-355 Enacted 07/11/84
 P.L. 98-369 Enacted 07/18/84 Deficit Reduction Act of 1984
 P.L. 98-378 Enacted 08/16/84 Child Support Enforcement Amendments of 1984
 P.L. 98-397 Enacted 08/23/84 Retirement Equity Act of 1984
 P.L. 98-443 Enacted 10/04/84 Civil Aeronautics Board Sunset Act of 1984
 P.L. 98-473 Enacted 10/12/84
 P.L. 98-573 Enacted 10/30/84
 P.L. 98-611 Enacted 10/31/84
 P.L. 98-612 Enacted 10/31//84
 P.L. 98-620 Enacted 11/08/84
 P.L. 99-44 Enacted 05/24/85
 P.L. 99-92 Enacted 08/16/85
 P.L. 99-121 Enacted 10/11/85
 P.L. 99-221 Enacted 12/26/85 Cherokee Leasing Act
 P.L. 99-234 Enacted 01/02/86 Federal Cvilian Employee and Contractor Travel Expenses Act of 1985
 P.L. 99-272 Enacted 04/07/86 Consolidated Omnibus Budget Reconciliation Act of 1985
 P.L. 99-308 Enacted 05/19/86 Firearms Owner's Protection Act
 P.L. 99-335 Enacted 06/06/86
 P.L. 99-386 Enacted 08/22/86 Congressional Reports Elimination Act of 1986
 P.L. 99-499 Enacted 10/17/86 Superfund Amendments and Reauthorization Act of 1986
 P.L. 99-509 Enacted 10/21/86 Omnibus Amendments and Reauthorization Act of 1986
 P.L. 99-514 Enacted 10/22/86 Tax Reform Act of 1986
 P.L. 99-595 Enacted 10/31/86
 P.L. 99-640 Enacted 11/10/86 Coast Guard Authorization Act of 1986
 P.L. 99-662 Enacted 11/17/86 Water Resources Development Act of 1986
 P.L. 100-17 Enacted 04/02/87 Surface Transportation and Uniform Relocation Assistance Act of 1987
 P.L. 100-202 Enacted 12/22/87 Continuing Appopriations, Fiscal Year 1988
 P.L. 100-203 Enacted 12/22/87 Revenue Act of 1987
 P.L. 100-223 Enacted 12/30/87 Airport and Airway Revenue Act of 1987
 P.L. 100-360 Enacted 07/01/88 Medicare Catastrophic Coverage Act of 1988
 P.L. 100-418 Enacted 08/23/88 Omnibus Trade and Competitiveness Act of 1988
 P.L. 100-448 Enacted 09/28/88 Coast Guard Authorization Act of 1988
 P.L. 100-485 Enacted 10/13/88 Family Support Act of 1988
 P.L. 100-647 Enacted 11/10/88 Technical and Miscellaneous Revenue Act of 1988
 P.L. 100-690 Enacted 11/18/88 Anti-Drug Abuse Act of 1988
 P.L. 100-707 Enacted 11/23/88 Disaster Relief and Emergency Assistance Amendments of 1988
 P.L. 101-73 Enacted 08/09/89 Financial Institutions Reform, Recovery, and Enforcement Act of 1989
 P.L. 101-140 Enacted 11/08/89
 P.L. 101-194 Enacted 11/30/89 Ethics Reform Act of 1989
 P.L. 101-221 Enacted 12/12/89 Steel Trade Liberalization Program Implementation Act
 P.L. 101-234 Enacted 12/13/89 Medicare Catastrophic Coverage Repeal Act of 1989
 P.L. 101-239 Enacted 12/19/89 Omnibus Budget Reconciliation Act of 1989

1990s

 P.L. 101-280 Enacted 05/04/90
 P.L. 101-380 Enacted 08/18/90 Oil Pollution Act of 1990
 P.L. 101-382 Enacted 08/20/90 Customs and Trade Act of 1990
 P.L. 101-508 Enacted 11/05/90 Omnibus Budget Reconciliation Act of 1990
 P.L. 101-624 Enacted 11/28/90 Food, Agriculture, Conservation, and Trade Act of 1990
 P.L. 101-647 Enacted 11/29/90 Crime Control Act of 1990
 P.L. 101-649 Enacted 11/29/90 Immigration Act of 1990
 P.L. 102-02 Enacted 01/30/91
 P.L. 102-90 Enacted 08/14/91 Legislative Branche Appropriation Act
 P.L. 102-164 Enacted 11/15/91 Emergency Unemployment Compensation Act of 1991
 P.L. 102-227 Enacted 12/11/91 Tax Extension Act of 1991
 P.L. 102-240 Enacted 12/18/91 Intermodal Surface Transportation Efficiency Act of 1991
 P.L. 102-244 Enacted 02/07/92
 P.L. 102-318 Enacted 07/03/92 Unemployment Compensation Amendments of 1992
 P.L. 102-393 Enacted 10/06/92 Treasury, Postal Service, and General Government Appropriations Act, 1993
 P.L. 102-486 Enacted 10/24/92 Energy Policy Act of 1992
 P.L. 102-568 Enacted 10/29/92 Veterans' Benefits Act of 1992
 P.L. 102-572 Enacted 10/29/92 Court of Federal Claims Technical and Procedural Improvements Act of 1992
 P.L. 102-581 Enacted 10/31/92 Airport and Airway Safety, Capacity, Noise Improvement, and Intermodal Transportation Act of 1992
 P.L. 103-66 Enacted 08/10/93 Omnibus Budget Reconciliation Act of 1993
 P.L. 103-149 Enacted 11/22/93 South African Democratic Transition Support Act of 1993
 P.L. 103-178 Enacted 12/03/93 Intelligence Authorization Act for Fiscal Year 1994
 P.L. 103-182 Enacted 12/08/1993 North American Free Trade Agreement Implementation Act
 P.L. 103-260 Enacted 05/26/94 Airport Improvement Program Temporary Extension Act of 1994
 P.L. 103-272 Enacted 07/05/94
 P.L. 103-296 Enacted 08/15/94 Social Security Independence and Program Improvements Act of 1994
 P.L. 103-305 Enacted 08/23/1994 Federal Aviation Administration Authorization Act of 1994
 P.L. 103-322 Enacted 09/13/94 Violent Crime Control and Law Enforcement Act of 1994
 P.L. 103-337 Enacted 10/05/94 National Defense Authorizations Act for Fiscal Year 1995
 P.L. 103-387 Enacted 10/22/94 Social Security Domestic Employment Reform Act of 1994
 P.L. 103-429 Enacted 01/31/94
 P.L. 103-465 Enacted 12/08/94 Uruguay Round Agreements Act
 P.L. 104-7 Enacted 04/11/95 Self-Employed Health Insurance Act
 P.L. 104-88 Enacted 12/29/95 ICC Termination Act of 1995
 P.L. 104-117 Enacted 03/20/96
 P.L. 104-134 Enacted 04/26/96 Debt collection Improvement Act of 1996
 P.L. 104-168 Enacted 07/30/96 Taxpayer Bill of Rights 2
 P.L. 104-188 Enacted 08/20/96 Small Business Job Protection Act 1996
 P.L. 104-191 Enacted 08/21/96 Health Insurance Portability And Accountability Act of 1996
 P.L. 104-193 Enacted 08/22/96 Personal Responsibility and Work Opportunity Reconciliation Act of 1996
 P.L. 104-201 Enacted 09/23/96 National Defense Authorization Act for Fiscal Year 1997
 P.L. 104-208 Enacted 09/30/96 Deposit Insurance Funds Act of 1996
 P.L. 104-264 Enacted 10/09/96 Federal Aviation Reauthorization Act of 1996
 P.L. 104-303 Enacted 10/12/96 Water Rescources Development Act of 1996
 P.L. 104-316 Enacted 10/19/16 General Accounting Office Act of 1996
 P.L. 105-2 Enacted 02/28/97 Airport and Airway Trust Fund Tax Reinstatement Act of 1997
 P.L. 105-33 Enacted 08/05/97 Balanced Budget Act of 1997
 P.L. 105-34 Enacted 08/05/97 Taxpayer Relief Act of 1997
 P.L. 105-35 Enacted 08/05/97 Taxpayer Browsing Protection Act
 P.L. 105-61 Enacted 10/10/97 Treasury and General Government Appropriations Act, 1998
 P.L. 105-65 Enacted 10/27/97 Departments of Veterans Affairs and Housing and Urban Development, and Independent Agencies Appropriations Act, 1998
 P.L. 105-78 Enacted 11/13/97 Departments of Labor, Health and Human Services and Education, and Related Agencies Appropriations Act, 1998
 P.L. 105-102 Enacted 11/20/97
 P.L. 105-115 Enacted 11/21/97 Food and Drug Administration (FDA) Modernization Act of 1997
 P.L. 105-130 Enacted 12/01/97 Surface Transportation Extension Act of 1997
 P.L. 105-178 Enacted 06/09/98 Transportation Equity Act for the 21st Century
 P.L. 105-206 Enacted 07/22/98 Internal Revenue Service Restructuring and Reform Act of 1998
 P.L. 105-261 Enacted 10/17/98
 P.L. 105-277 Enacted 10/21/98 Tax and Trade Relief Extension Act of 1998
 P.L. 105-277 Enacted 10/21/98 Vaccine Injury Compensation Program Modification Act
 P.L. 105-306 Enacted 10/28/98 Noncitizen Benefit Clarification and Other Technical Amendments Act of 1998
 P.L. 106-21 Enacted 04/19/99
 P.L. 106-36 Enacted 06/25/99 Miscellaneous trade and Technical Corrections Act of 1999
 P.L. 106-78 Enacted 10/22/99 Agriculture, Rural Development, Food and Drug Administration, and Related Agencies Appropriations Act, 2000
 P.L. 106-170 Enacted 12/17/99 Tax Relief Extension Act of 1999

2000s

 P.L. 106-181 Enacted 04/05/00 Wendell H. Ford Aviation Investment and Reform Act for the 21st Century
 P.L. 106-200 Enacted 05/18/00 Trade and Development Act of 2000
 P.L. 106-230 Enacted 07/01/00
 P.L. 106-408 Enacted 11/01/00 Wildlife and Sport Fish Restoration Programs Improvement Act of 2000
 P.L. 106-476 Enacted 11/09/00 Imported Cigarette Compliance Act of 2000
 P.L. 106-519 Enacted 11/15/00 FSC Repeal and Extraterritorial Income Exclusion Act of 2000
 P.L. 106-554 Enacted 12/21/00 Community Renewal Tax Relief Act of 2000
 P.L. 106-573 Enacted 12/28/00 Installment tax Correction Act of 2000
 P.L. 107-15 Enacted 06/05/01 Fallen Hero Survivor Benefit Fairness Act of 2001
 P.L. 107-16 Enacted 06/07/01 Economic Growth and Tax Relief Reconciliation Act of 2001
 P.L. 107-22 Enacted 7/26/01 
 P.L. 107-71 Enacted 11/19/01 Aviation and Transportation Security Act
 P.L. 107-90 Enacted 12/21/01 Railroad Retirement and Survivors' Improvement Act of 2001
 P.L. 107-110 Enacted 01/08/02 No Child Left Behind Act of 2001
 P.L. 107-116 Enacted 01/10/02 Departments of Labor, Health, and Human Services, and Education, and Related Agencies Appropriations Act, 2002
 P.L. 107-131 Enacted 01/16/02
 P.L. 107-134 Enacted 01/23/02 Victims of Terrorism Tax Relief Act of 2001
 P.L. 107-147 Enacted 03/09/02 Job Creation and Worker Assistance Act of 2002
 P.L. 107-181 Enacted 05/20/02 Clergy Housing Allowance Clarification Act of 2002
 P.L. 107-210 Enacted 08/06/02 Trade Act of 2002
 P.L. 107-217 Enacted 08/21/02
 P.L. 107-276 Enacted 11/02/02
 P.L. 107-296 Enacted 11/25/02 Homeland Security Act of 2002
 P.L. 107-330 Enacted 12/06/02 Veterans Benefits Act of 2002
 P.L. 108-27 Enacted 05/28/03 Jobs and Growth Tax Relief Reconciliation Act of 2003
 P.L. 108-88 Enacted 09/30/03 Surface Transportation Extension Act of 2003
 P.L. 108-89 Enacted 10/01/03
 P.L. 108-121 Enacted 11/11/03 Military Family Tax Relief Act of 2003
 P.L. 108-173 Enacted 12/08/03 Medicare Prescription Drug, Improvement, and Modernization Act of 2003
 P.L. 108-176 Enacted 12/12/03 Vision 100--Century of Aviation Reauthorization Act
 P.L. 108-178 Enacted 12/15/03
 P.L. 108-189 Enacted 12/19/03
 P.L. 108-202 Enacted 02/29/04 Surface Transportation Extension Act of 2004
 P.L. 108-203 Enacted 03/02/04 Social Security Protection Act of 2004
 P.L. 108-218 Enacted 04/10/04 Pension Funding Equity Act of 2004
 P.L. 108-224 Enacted 04/30/04 Surface Transportation Extension Act of 2004, Part II
 P.L. 108-263 Enacted 06/30/04 Surface Transportation Extension Act of 2004, Part III
 P.L. 108-280 Enacted 07/30/04 Surface Transportation Extension Act of 2004, Part IV
 P.L. 108-310 Enacted 09/30/04 Surface Transportation Extension Act of 2004, Part V
 P.L. 108-311 Enacted 10/04/04 Working Families Tax Relief Act of 2004
 P.L. 108-357 Enacted 10/22/04 American Jobs Creation Act of 2004
 P.L. 108-375 Enacted 10/28/04 Ronald W. Reagan National Defense Authorization Act for Fiscal Year 2005
 P.L. 108-429 Enacted 12/03/04 Miscellaneous Trade and Technical Corrections Act of 2004
 P.L. 108-493 Enacted 12/23/04
 P.L. 109-6 Enacted 03/31/05
 P.L. 109-7 Enacted 04/15/05
 P.L. 109-14 Enacted 05/31/05 Surface Transportation Extension Act of 2005
 P.L. 109-20 Enacted 07/01/05 Surface Transportation Extension Act of 2005, Part II
 P.L. 109-35 Enacted 07/20/05 Surface Transportation Extension Act of 2005, Part III
 P.L. 109-37 Enacted 07/22/05 Surface Transportation Extension Act of 2005, Part IV
 P.L. 109-40 Enacted 07/28/05 Surface Transportation Extension Act of 2005, Part V
 P.L. 109-42 Enacted 07/30/05 Surface Transportation Extension Act of 2005, Part VI
 P.L. 109-58 Enacted 08/08/05 Energy Tax Incentives Act of 2005
 P.L. 109-59 Enacted 08/10/05 Safe, Accountable, Flexible, Efficient Transportation Equity Act: A Legacy for Users
 P.L. 109-73 Enacted 09/23/05 Katrina Emergency Tax Relief Act of 2005
 P.L. 109-74 Enacted 09/29/05 Sportfishing and Recreational Boating Safety Amendments Act of 2005
 P.L. 109-135 Enacted 12/21/05 Gulf Opportunity Zone Act of 2005
 P.L. 109-151 Enacted 12/30/05
 P.L. 109-171 Enacted 02/08/06 Deficit Reduction Act of 2005
 P.L. 109-222 Enacted 05/17/06 Tax Increase Prevention and Reconciliation Act of 2005
 P.L. 109-227 Enacted 05/29/06 Heroes Earned Retirement Opportunities Act
 P.L. 109-241 Enacted 07/11/06 Coast Guard and Maritime Transportation Act of 2006
 P.L. 109-280 Enacted 08/17/06 Pension Protection Act of 2006
 P.L. 109-304 Enacted 10/06/06
 P.L. 109-432 Enacted 12/20/06 Tax Relief and Health Care Act of 2006
 P.L. 109-433 Enacted 12/20/06
 P.L. 110-28 Enacted 05/25/07 U.S. Troop Readiness, Veterans' Care, Katrina Recovery, and Iraq Accountability Appropriations Act, 2007
 P.L. 110-28 Enacted 05/25/07 Small Business and Work Opportunity Tax Act of 2007
 P.L. 110-92 Enacted 09/29/07
 P.L. 110-140 Enacted 12/19/07 Energy Independence and Security Act of 2007
 P.L. 110-142 Enacted 12/20/07 Mortgage Forgiveness Debt Relief Act of 2007
 P.L. 110-161 Enacted 12/26/07 Department of Transportation Appropriations Act, 2008
 P.L. 110-166 Enacted 12/26/07 Tax Increase Prevention Act of 2007
 P.L. 110-172 Enacted 12/29/07 Tax Technical Corrections Act of 2007
 P.L. 110-176 Enacted 01/04/08
 P.L. 110-177 Enacted 01/07/08 Court Security Improvement Act of 2007
 P.L. 110-185 Enacted 02/13/08 Economic Stimulus Act of 2008
 P.L. 110-190 Enacted 02/28/08 Airport and Airway Extension Act of 2008
 P.L. 110-233 Enacted 05/21/08 Genetic Information Nondiscrimination Act of 2008
 P.L. 110-244 Enacted 06/06/08 SAFETEA-LU Technical Corrections Act of 2008
 P.L. 110-245 Enacted 06/17/08 Heroes Earnings Assistance and Relief Tax Act of 2008
 P.L. 110-246 Enacted 05/22/08 Food, Conservation and Energy Act of 2008
 P.L. 110-246 Enacted 05/22/08 Heartland, Habitat, Harvest, and Horticulture Act of 2008
 P.L. 110-253 Enacted 06/30/08 Federal Aviation Administration Extension Act of 2008
 P.L. 110-289 Enacted 07/30/08 Housing Assistance Tax Act of 2008
 P.L. 110-289 Enacted 07/30/08 Federal Housing Finance Regulatory Reform Act of 2008
 P.L. 110-317 Enacted 08/29/08 Hubbard Act
 P.L. 110-318 Enacted 09/15/08
 P.L. 110-328 Enacted 09/30/08 SSI Extension for Elderly and Disabled Refugees Act
 P.L. 110-330 Enacted 09/30/08 Federal Aviation Administration Extension Act of 2008, Part II
 P.L. 110-343 Enacted 10/03/08 Emergency Economic Stabilization Act of 2008
 P.L. 110-343 Enacted 10/03/08 Energy Improvement and Extension Act of 2008
 P.L. 110-343 Enacted 10/03/08 Tax Extenders and Alternative Minimum Tax Relief Act of 2008
 P.L. 110-343 Enacted 10/03/08 Paul Wellstone and Pete Domenici Mental Health Parity and Addiction Equity Act of 2008
 P.L. 110-343 Enacted 10/03/08 Heartland Disaster Tax Relief Act of 2008
 P.L. 110-351 Enacted 10/07/08 Fostering Connections to Success and Increasing Adoptions Act of 2008
 P.L. 110-381 Enacted 10/09/08 Michelle's Law
 P.L. 110-428 Enacted 10/15/08 Inmate Tax Fraud Prevention Act of 2008
 P.L. 110-458 Enacted 12/23/08 Worker, Retiree, and Employer Recovery Act of 2008
 P.L. 111-3 Enacted 02/04/09 Children's Health Insurance Program Reauthorization Act of 2009
 P.L. 111-5 Enacted 02/17/09 American Recovery and Reinvestment Tax Act of 2009
 P.L. 111-8 Enacted 03/11/09 Omnibus Appropriation Act, 2009
 P.L. 111-12 Enacted 03/30/09 Federal Aviation Administration Extension Act of 2009
 P.L. 111-46 Enacted 08/07/09
 P.L. 111-68 Enacted 10/01/09
 P.L. 111-69 Enacted 10/01/09 Fiscal Year 2010 Federal Aviation Administration Extension Act
 P.L. 111-88 Enacted 10/30/09
 P.L. 111-92 Enacted 11/06/09 Worker, Homeownership, and Business Assistance Act of 2009
 P.L. 111-116 Enacted 12/16/09 Fiscal Year 2010 Federal Aviation Administration Extension Act, Part II

2010s
 P.L. 111-144 Enacted 03/02/10 Temporary Extension Act of 2010
 P.L. 111-147 Enacted 03/18/10 Hiring Incentives to Restore Employment Act
 P.L. 111-148 Enacted 03/23/10 Patient Protection and Affordable Care Act
 P.L. 111-152 Enacted 03/30/10 Health Care and Education Reconciliation Act of 2010
 P.L. 111-153 Enacted 03/31/10 Federal Aviation Administration Extension Act of 2010
 P.L. 111-159 Enacted 04/26/10 TRICARE Affirmation Act
 P.L. 111-161 Enacted 04/30/10 Airport and Airway Extension Act of 2010
 P.L. 111-173 Enacted 05/27/10
 P.L. 111-192 Enacted 06/25/10 Preservation of Access to Care for Medicare Beneficiaries and Pension Relief Act of 2010
 P.L. 111-197 Enacted 07/02/10 Airport and Airway Extension Act of 2010, Part II
 P.L. 111-198 Enacted 07/02/10 Homebuyer Assistance and Improvement Act of 2010
 P.L. 111-203 Enacted 07/21/10 Dodd-Frank Wall street Reform and Consumer Protection Act
 P.L. 111-216 Enacted 08/01/10 Airline Safety and Federal Aviation Administration Extension Act of 2010
 P.L. 111-226 Enacted 08/10/10
 P.L. 111-237 Enacted 08/16/10 Firearms Excise Tax Improvement Act of 2010
 P.L. 111-240 Enacted 09/27/10 Creating Small Business Jobs Act of 2010
 P.L. 111-249 Enacted 09/30/10 Airport and Airway Extension Act of 2010, Part III
 P.L. 111-291 Enacted 12/08/10 Claims Resolution Act of 2010
 P.L. 111-309 Enacted 12/15/10 Medicare and Medicaid Extenders Act of 2010
 P.L. 111-312 Enacted 12/17/10 Tax Relief, Unemployment Insurance Reauthorization, and Job Creation Act of 2010
 P.L. 111-322 Enacted 12/22/10 Continuing Appropriations and Surface Transportation Extensions Act of 2011
 P.L. 111-325 Enacted 12/22/10 Regulated Investment Company Modernization Act of 2010
 P.L. 111-329 Enacted 12/22/10 Airport and Airway Extension Act of 2010, Part IV
 P.L. 111-344 Enacted 12/29/10 Omnibus Trade Act of 2010
 P.L. 111-347 Enacted 01/02/11 James Zadroga 9/11 Health and Compensation Act of 2010
 P.L. 111-350 Enacted 01/04/11
 P.L. 111-366 Enacted 01/04/11
 P.L. 112-5 Enacted 03/04/11 Surface Transportation and Extension Act of 2011
 P.L. 112-7 Enacted 03/31/11 Airport and Airway Extension Act of 2011
 P.L. 112-9 Enacted 04/14/11 Comprehensive 1099 Taxpayer Protection and Repayment ofExchange Subsidy Overpayments Act of 2011
 P.L. 112-10 Enacted 04/15/11 Department of Defense and Full-Year Continuing Appropriations Act, 2011
 P.L. 112-16 Enacted 05/31/11 Airport and Airway Extension Act of 2011, Part II
 P.L. 112-21 Enacted 06/29/11 Airport and Airway Extension Act of 2011, Part III
 P.L. 112-27 Enacted 08/05/11 Airport andAirway Extension Act of 2011, Part IV
 P.L. 112-30 Enacted 09/16/11 Surface and Air Transportation Programs Extension Act of 2011
 P.L. 112-40 Enacted 10/21/11 Trade Adjustment Assistance Extension Act of 2011
 P.L. 112-41 Enacted 10/21/11 United States-Korea Free Trade Agreement Implementation Act
 P.L. 112-56 Enacted 11/21/11 VOW to Hire Heroes Act of 2011
 P.L. 112-91 Enacted 01/31/12 Airport and Airway Extension Act of 2012
 P.L. 112-95 Enacted 02/14/12 FAA Modernization and Reform Act of 2012
 P.L. 112-96 Enacted 02/22/12 Middle Class Tax Relief and Job Creation Act of 2012
 P.L. 112-102 Enacted 03/30/12 Surface Transportation Extension Act of 2012
 P.L. 112-140 Enacted 06/29/12 Temporary Surface Transportation Extension Act of 2012
 P.L. 112-141 Enacted 07/06/12 Highway Investment, Job Creation, and Economic Growth Act of 2012
 P.L. 112-141 Enacted 07/06/12 Moving Ahead for Progress in the 21st Century Act (MAP-21)
 P.L. 112-239 Enacted 01/02/13 National Defense Authorization Act for Fiscal Year 2013
 P.L. 112-240 Enacted 01/02/13 American Taxpayer Relief Act of 2012
 P.L. 113-15 Enacted 06/25/13
 P.L. 113-22 Enacted 07/25/13
 P.L. 113-94 Enacted 04/03/14 Gabriella Miller Kids First Research Act
 P.L. 113-97 Enacted 04/07/14 Cooperative and Small Employer Charity Pension Flexibility Act
 P.L. 113-121 Enacted 06/10/14 Water Resources Reform and Development Act of 2014
 P.L. 113-128 Enacted 07/22/14 Workforce Innovation and Opportunity Act
 P.L. 113-159 Enacted 08/08/14 Highway and Transportation Funding Act of 2014
 P.L. 113-168 Enacted 09/26/14 Tribal General Welfare Exclusion Act of 2014
 P.L. 113-188 Enacted 11/26/14 Government Reports Elimination Act of 2014
 P.L. 113-235 Enacted 12/16/14 Consolidated and Further Continuing Appropriations Act, 2015
 P.L. 113-287 Enacted 12/19/14
 P.L. 113-295 Enacted 12/19/14 Tax Increase Prevention Act of 2014
 P.L. 113-295 Enacted 12/19/14 Tax Technical Corrections Act of 2014
 P.L. 113-295 Enacted 12/19/14 Stephen Beck, Jr., Achieving a Better Life Experience Act of 2014
 P.L. 114-10 Enacted 04/16/15 Medicare Access and CHIP Reauthorization Act of 2015
 P.L. 114-14 Enacted 05/22/15 Don't Tax Our Fallen Public Safety Heroes Act
 P.L. 114-21 Enacted 05/29/15 Highway and Transportation Funding Act of 2015
 P.L. 114-26 Enacted 06/29/15 Defending Public Safety Employees' Retirement Act
 P.L. 114-27 Enacted 06/29/15 Trade Preferences Extension Act of 2015
 P.L. 114-27 Enacted 06/29/15 Trade Adjustment Assistance Reauthorization Act of 2015
 P.L. 114-41 Enacted 07/31/15 Surface Transportation and Veterans Health Care Choice Improvement Act of 2015
 P.L. 114-55 Enacted 09/30/15 Airport and Airway Extension Act of 2015
 P.L. 114-73 Enacted 10/29/15 Surface Transportation Extension Act of 2015
 P.L. 114-74 Enacted 11/2/15 Bipartisan Budget Act of 2015
 P.L. 114-87 Enacted 11/20/15 Surface Transportation Extension Act of 2015, Part II
 P.L. 114-92 Enacted 11/25/15 National Defense Authorization Act for Fiscal Year 2016
 P.L. 114-94 Enacted 12/04/15 Fixing America's Surface Transportation Act
 P.L. 114-95 Enacted 12/10/15 Every Student Succeeds Act
 P.L. 114-113 Enacted 12/18/15 Consolidated Appropriations Act, 2016
 P.L. 114-125 Enacted 02/24/16 Trade Facilitation and Trade Enforcement Act of 2015
 P.L. 114-141 Enacted 03/30/16 Airport and Airway Extension Act of 2016
 P.L. 114-184 Enacted 06/30/16 Recovering Missing Children Act
 P.L. 114-190 Enacted 07/15/16 FAA Extension, Safety, and Security Act of 2016
 P.L. 114-239 Enacted 10/07/16 United States Appreciation for Olympians and Paralympians Act of 2016
 P.L. 114-255 Enacted 12/13/16 21st Century Cures Act
 P.L. 114-328 Enacted 12/23/16 National Defense Authorization Act for Fiscal Year 2017
 P.L. 115-63 Enacted 09/29/17 Disaster Tax Relief and Airport and Airway Extension Act of 2017
 P.L. 115-97 Enacted 12/22/17 Tax Cuts and Jobs Act of 2017
 P.L. 115-120 Enacted 01/22/18
 P.L. 115-123 Enacted 02/09/18 Bipartisan Budget Act of 2018
 P.L. 115-141 Enacted 03/23/2018 Consolidated Appropriations Act, 2018
 P.L. 115-232 Enacted 08/13/2018 John S. McCain National Defense Authorization Act for Fiscal Year 2019
 P.L. 115-243 Enacted 09/20/2018 Tribal Social Security Fairness Act of 2018
 P.L. 115-250 Enacted 09/29/2018 Airport and Airway Extension Act of 2018, Part II
 P.L. 115-254 Enacted 10/05/2018 FAA Reauthorization Act of 2018
 P.L. 115-271 Enacted 10/24/2018 Substance Use-Disorder Prevention that Promotes Opioid Recovery and Treatment (SUPPORT) for Patients and Communities Act of 2019
 P.L. 116-25 Enacted 07/01/2019 Taxpayer First Act
 P.L. 116-59 Enacted 10/01/2019 Continuing Appropriations Act, 2020, and Health Extenders Act of 2019
 P.L. 116-69 Enacted 11/21/2019 Further Continuing Appropriations Act, 2020, and Further Health Extenders Act of 2019
 P.L. 116-91 Enacted 12/19/2019 Fostering Undergraduate Talent by Unlocking Resources for Education Act
 P.L. 116-92 Enacted 12/20/2019 National Defense Authorization Act for Fiscal Year 2020
 P.L. 116-94 Enacted 12/20/2019 Further Consolidated Appropriations Act, 2020

2020s
 P.L. 116-127 Enacted 03/18/20 Families First Coronavirus Response Act
 P.L. 116-136 Enacted 03/27/20 Coronavirus Aid, Relief, and Economic Security Act
 P.L. 116-159 Enacted 10/01/20 Continuing Appropriations Act, 2021 and Other Extensions Act
 P.L. 116-260 Enacted 12/27/20 Consolidated Appropriations Act, 2021
 P.L. 116-283 Enacted 01/01/21 William M. (Mac) Thornberry National Defense Authorization Act for Fiscal Year 2021
 P.L. 117-2 Enacted 03/11/21 American Rescue Plan Act of 2021
 P.L. 117-58 Enacted 11/15/21 Infrastructure Investment and Jobs Act (IIJA)
  Enacted 08/16/22 Inflation Reduction Act of 2022
 _ Consolidated Appropriations Act, 2023

Citations
 Internal Revenue Code: Income, Estate, Gift, Employment & Excise Taxes (Internal Revenue Code. Winter) CCH Tax Law Editors

µ
µ